Kazimierz Trampisz (10 January 1929 – 12 August 2014) was a Polish footballer (striker) played most of the time in Polonia Bytom during golden era of this club. Trampisz played 10 times in Poland national football team scoring three goals. He participated in 1952 Summer Olympics scoring one goal against France. He later coached Stal Rzeszów and GKS Jastrzębie

References

External links

 

1929 births
2014 deaths
Polonia Bytom players
Polish footballers
Poland international footballers
Footballers at the 1952 Summer Olympics
Olympic footballers of Poland
Sportspeople from Ivano-Frankivsk
People from Stanisławów Voivodeship
Polish football managers
Stal Rzeszów managers
Polonia Bytom managers
Association football forwards
Stal Rzeszów players